Soe Tha (also spelt Soe Thar; born 7 November 1944) is a Burmese politician, previously served as a member of the Pyithu Hluttaw, the country's lower house, representing Twante Township in Yangon Region. He is a former Minister for National Planning and Economic Development.

References

1944 births
Members of Pyithu Hluttaw
Union Solidarity and Development Party politicians
Government ministers of Myanmar
Living people
Specially Designated Nationals and Blocked Persons List
Individuals related to Myanmar sanctions